is a freelance Japanese actor, voice actor and narrator who was formerly affiliated with Aoni Production, 81 Produce and the Tokyo Actor's Consumer's Cooperative Society.

Due to his deep voice, he often plays villainous characters like fellow voice actor Norio Wakamoto, either in children's programs such as Mahōjin Guru Guru (as Lord Giri), Myotismon from Digimon, Crocodile from One Piece, Montana Jones (as Lord Zero), Yūsha Keisatsu J-Decker (as Jūsan Saejima) and Shadow the Hedgehog (as Black Doom). He has taken over ongoing roles for voice actors Shigezō Sasaoka, Eiji Kanie, Shinji Nakae, Daisuke Gōri and Hirotaka Suzuoki after their deaths. A number of his foreign film-dubbing roles are occupied by Tesshō Genda in different editions of those films.

Filmography

Television animation
1979
 The Ultraman (Roiger)
1980
 Zenderman (Musashi)
1988
 Soreike! Anpanman (Kaseki no Maō)
1990
 The Three-Eyed One (Macbeth)
1991
 Yokoyama Mitsuteru Sangokushi (Dong Zhuo)
1992
 O~i! Ryoma (Gurabā)
 Crayon Shin-chan (Pippen)
1994
 Brave Police J-Decker (Juzo Saejima, Narrator)
 Dragon Ball Z (Dabra)
 Ginga Sengoku Gun'yūden Rai (Geni)
 Kitaretsu Daihyakka (Priest)
 Macross 7 (Suren Rangu)
 Montana Jones (Lord Zero, Feudal Lord)
 Tottemo! Luckyman (Senkaoman, Hitman)
1995
 Aris Tantei Kyoku (Urufu-san)
 Fushigi Yūgi (Ashitare - Oyado)
 Kaitō Saint Tail (Board Chairman)
 Kūsōkagashi Sekai Gulliver Boy (Paeria)
 Demon Beast Resurrection (Mailman)
 Mahōjin Guru Guru (Lord Giri (second voice))
 Virtua Fighter (Jeffry McWild)
1996
 Bakusō Kyōdai Let's & Go!! series (Doctor Ōgami)
 Brave Command Dagwon (Super Lifeform Genocide)
 Dragon Ball GT (Liu Xing Long, Giant)
 GeGeGe no Kitarō (fourth series) (Oboro Kuroma, Mizutora, Kaiwanao)
 Jigoku Sensei Nūbē (Sauraki)
 Detective Conan (Okita, Shōji Mutsuda)
1997
 Bakusō Kyōdai Let's & Go!! WGP (Principal)
 Chō Mashin Eiyūden Wataru (Kurogane no Kenō)
 Dr. Slump (Unmō, Enma Daiō)
 Dragon Ball GT Special: Gokū Gaiden! Yūki no Akashishi ha Shiseikyū (Yōmaō)
 Hakugei Densetsu (Barba)
 Kindaichi Shōnen no Jigenbo (Zensuke Ōkōchi)
 Kyūketsu Hime Miyu (Kami-Ma Garyū)
 Detective Conan (Atsushi Mori practitioner)
 Nintama Rantarō (Fūki (second episode))
 Weiß Kreuz (Shigemi Yokō)
1998
  (Zack Landis)
 Bakusō Kyōdai Let's & Go!! Max (Gen-san)
 BB-Daman Bakugaiden (Darkmazā, Dark Emperor)
 Cowboy Bebop (Abdul Hakim)
 Kurogane Communication (Industrial Enterprise Master)
 Detective Conan (Shirō Hiraoka)
 Pocket Monsters (Fushigibana [Venusaur], Muramasa)
 Sentimental Journey (Gakkōrei (Boss))
 Trigun (Denim)
 Yu-Gi-Oh! (Ushio)
1999
 Digimon Adventure (Vamdemon, VenomVamdemon)
 Excel Saga (Doctor Kabapu)
 Gregory Horror Show (Hell's Chef)
 Detective Conan (Criminal A, Hiruta, Michiaki Okuda)
2000
 Doki Doki Densetsu Mahōjin Guru Guru (Lord Giri)
 Inuyasha (Hōsenki I)
 Detective Conan (Arson offender)
 Pocket Monsters (Muramasa)
2001
 Super GALS! Kotobuki Ran (Mami's Father)
 Ōdorobō Jing (Baffle D'Ice)
2002
 Digimon Frontier (Cherubimon)
 Dragon Drive (Saizō Toki)
 One Piece (Crocodile)
2003
 Ashita no Nadja (Gérard)
 Astro Boy: Mighty Atom (Gafu)
 Bobobo-bo Bo-bobo (Gunkan)
 Divergence Eve (Luke Walker)
 Gungrave (Bear Walken)
 Konjiki no Gash Bell!! (Demolt)
 Detective Conan (Saguru Itakura)
 Jūbei Ninpūchō: Ryūhōgyoku Hen (Tessai)
 Planetes (Hakim Ashmead)
2004
 Bōken Ō Beet (Grunide)
 Initial D Fourth Stage (Kōzō Hoshino)
 Kaiketsu Zorori (Kichizō Kumada)
 Detective Conan (Detective)
 Samurai 7 (Genzō)
 Samurai Champloo (Ishimatsu (episodes 3 and 4))
 Tenjho Tenge (Kaiba Natsume)
2005
 Gaiking: Legend of Daiku-Maryu (Daimon, Darius the Seventeenth)
 Pani Poni Dash! (Hirosuke)
 Speed Grapher (Father Kanda)
2006
 Kiba (J Rock)
 Sōten no Ken (Ke-Rong Jin)
2007
 Himawari! (Businessman)
2008
 Bleach (Aaroniero Arruruerie - deep-voiced head)
 Mobile Suit Gundam 00 (Homer Katagiri)
2009
 Fullmetal Alchemist: Brotherhood (Buccaneer)
 Sgt. Frog (Witness)
2010
 Kiddy Girl-and (Basil)
 Dragon Ball Kai (Porunga, Gyū-Maō, King Cold)
2011
 Wolverine (Omega Red)
 Digimon Xros Wars (Sethmon)
 Digimon Xros Wars: The Young Hunters Who Leapt Through Time (Ogremon)
2012
 Mobile Suit Gundam AGE (Fezarl Ezelcant)
 Saint Seiya Ω (Capricorn Ionia)
2013
 Freezing Vibration - Howard el Bridget
2014
 Dragon Ball Kai (Dabra, Shenlong, Gyū-Maō)
2015
 Fafner in the Azure: EXODUS (Narain Wiseman-Bose)
 Yo-kai Watch: The Movie (Lord von Shadow)
 Dragon Ball Super (Shenlong, Gyū-Maō)
2016
 Pandora in the Crimson Shell: Ghost Urn (Janus North)
2017
 Princess Principal (Todo Jubei (ep. 5))
 Digimon Universe: Appli Monsters (Deusmon)
2018
Legend of the Galactic Heroes: Die Neue These (Steinhof)
Baki (Ando (Ep. 25))
2019
Obsolete (Zahir)
2021
 One Piece (Edward Newgate, Kozuki Sukiyaki)

Original video animation (OVA)
Crying Freeman (1988) (Oshu Tohgoku)
Legend of the Blue Wolves (Continental)
Legend of the Galactic Heroes (1988) (Sandoru Ararukon)
La Blue Girl (1992) (Zipang)
Tenchi Muyo! Ryo-Ohki (1992) (D3)
Twin Angels (1995) (Demon)
Urotsukidoji (1993) (Caesar)
El-Hazard (1995) (Galus)
Bio Hunter (1995) (Mikawa)
Street Fighter Alpha: The Animation (2000) (Birdie)
Macross Zero (2002) (D. D. Ivanov)
Avengers Confidential: Black Widow & Punisher (2014) (Cain)

Theatrical animation
Lupin III: Dead or Alive (1996) (Chief warden, officer)
Episode of Alabasta: The Desert Princess and the Pirates (2007) (Crocodile)
Pokémon: The First Movie (1998) (Venusaur)
Soreike! Anpanman: Palm of the Hand to the Sun (Great black devil)
Tenchi Muyo! in Love (1995) (Kain)
Naruto Shippuden The Movie: The Lost Tower: (2010) (Mukade/Anrokuzan)
Dragon Ball Z: Battle of Gods (2013) (Gyū-Maō)
Mobile Suit Gundam F91 (1991) (Nanto Roos)
Resident Evil: Vendetta (2017) (Diego Gomez)
Doraemon the Movie: Nobita's Treasure Island (2018) (Gaga)

Video games

 Ace Combat Zero: The Belkan War (Captain Dominic "Vulture" Zubov)
 Ace Combat 6: Fires of Liberation (Ghost Eye)
 American McGee's Alice (Cheshire Cat (Roger L. Jackson))
 Brave Saga 2 (Jūsan Saejima) 
 Crash Bandicoot: The Wrath of Cortex (Uka Uka (Clancy Brown))
 Crash Bash (Uka Uka (Clancy Brown))
 Crash Nitro Kart (Uka Uka (Clancy Brown))
 Crash Twinsanity (Uka Uka (Alex Fernandez))
 Dragon Ball Z: Budokai 2 (Dabra)
 Dragon Ball Z: Budokai 3 (Dabra)
 Dragon Ball Z: Budokai Tenkaichi series (Dabra)
 Dynasty Warriors: Gundam (Musha Gundam)
 Garasunobara (Kunio Hachiya)
 Gungrave (Bear Walken)
 Initial D Arcade Stage (Kōzō Hoshino)
 League of Legends (Cho'Gath, Thresh)
 The Last Blade series (Zantetsu)
 The Last Remnant (The Conqueror)
 Mega Man Battle & Chase (Napalm Man)
 Mega Man X4 (General)
 Musou Orochi Z (Taira no Kiyomori, Shingen Takeda)
 Ninja Gaiden 2 (Genshin)
 One Piece: Pirate Warriors (Crocodile)
 Power Stone 2 (Gourmand)
 Psychic Force 2012 (Gudeath)
 Samurai Warriors 3 Xtreme Legend (Shingen Takeda)
 Samurai Warriors 4 (Shingen Takeda)
 Samurai Warriors 4 II (Shingen Takeda)
 Shadow the Hedgehog (Black Doom)
 Shadow Hearts II (Grigori Rasputin)
 Solid Force (Yulgen Froint)
 Star Ocean: Till the End of Time (Crosell)
 Star Wars: Galactic Battlegrounds (Darth Vader (Scott Lawrence))
 Super Robot Wars series (Euzeth Gozzo, Ashura, Q Bosu, Buritai 7018, Gadesu, Ganan, Emperor Warusa)
 Tales of Legendia (Maurits, Nerifes) 
 Tales of Xillia 2 (Jiao)
 The Super Dimension Fortress Macross (Buritai Kuridaniku)
 Warriors Orochi 2 (Taira no Kiyomori, Shingen Takeda)

Drama CDs
Bad Boys! (Rikiya Hodate)

Dubbing roles

Live-action
 Michael Wincott
The Crow (1997 TV Tokyo edition) – Top Dollar
Romeo Is Bleeding – Sal
Metro – Michael Korda
 Clancy Brown
Highlander (1988 TV Asahi edition) – The Kurgan/Victor Kruger
Lost – Kelvin Joe Inman
Snow White: The Fairest of Them All – Granter of Wishes
 Ron Perlman
Alien Resurrection (VHS/DVD edition) – Johner
Conan the Barbarian – Corin
Fantastic Beasts and Where to Find Them – Gnarlak
 Ving Rhames
Con Air – Nathan "Diamond Dog" Jones
The Saint of Fort Washington – Little Leroy
Dave – Duane Stevenson
 Arnold Schwarzenegger
The Terminator (1987 TV Asahi and 1992 VHS editions) – T-800
Batman & Robin – Mr. Freeze
 Michael Clarke Duncan
The Green Mile – John Coffey
Daredevil – Kingpin
 Dennis Rodman
Double Team – Yaz
Soldier of Fortune, Inc. – Deacon 'Deke' Reynolds 
 Alan Rickman
Alice in Wonderland – Blue Caterpillar
Dogma – Metatron
10,000 BC (2011 TV Asahi edition) – Warlord (Affif Ben Badra)
Alien 3 (1998 TV Asahi version) – Edward Boggs (Leon Herbert)
Aliens (1993 TV Asahi Special Edition) – Private Mark Drake (Mark Rolston)
Amistad – Sengbe Pieh / Joseph Cinqué (Djimon Hounsou)
The Andromeda Strain – General George Mancheck (Andre Braugher)
Cadillac Records – Howlin' Wolf (Eamonn Walker)
Casino Royale (2009 TV Asahi edition) – Steven Obanno (Isaach de Bankolé)
Cobra (1994 TV Asahi edition) – The Night Slasher (Brian Thompson)
Company of Heroes – Brent Willoughby (Vinnie Jones)
The Crow – Grange (Tony Todd)
Cutthroat Island – Mr. Glasspool (Stan Shaw)
Cyborg (1991 TV Asahi edition) – Fender Tremolo (Vincent Klyn)
Das Boot (DVD edition) – Ario (Claude-Oliver Rudolph)
Die Hard with a Vengeance (1998 Fuji TV edition) – Otto (Richard E. Council)
Eight Legged Freaks (2008 TV Tokyo edition) – Leon (Jay Arlen Jones)
Ender's Game – Admiral Chjamrajnagar (Tony Mirrcandani)
Get Smart (2011 TV Asahi edition) – Dalip (Dalip Singh)
The Glimmer Man (DVD edition) – Donald Cunningham (John M. Jackson)
Goosebumps – Death (Episode: "Say Cheese and Die - Again!")
Heat (1998 TV Asahi edition) – Trejo (Danny Trejo)
The Hobbit trilogy – Smaug (Benedict Cumberbatch)
Joy Ride (DVD edition) – Rusty Nail (Ted Levine)
Mad Max 2 (1991 TBS edition) – Wez (Vernon Wells)
Major League (VHS/DVD edition) – Pedro (Dennis Haysbert)
Men in Black (VHS/DVD edition) – Edgar the Bug (Vincent D'Onofrio)
Men in Black II (VHS/DVD edition) – Pineal Eye (William E. Jackson)
Mercury Rising (DVD edition) – Peter Burrell (L.L. Ginter)
The Mummy – High Priest Imhotep (Arnold Vosloo)
The Mummy Returns (Fuji TV edition) – High Priest Imhotep (Arnold Vosloo)
Ordinary Decent Criminal – Noel Quigley (Steven Dillane)
Payback (Video and DVD edition) – Bronson (Kris Kristofferson)
Pirates of the Caribbean: The Curse of the Black Pearl – Bo'sun
Point Break – FBI Instructor Hall (Delroy Lindo)
Predator (1993 TV Asahi edition) – Billy (Sonny Landham), Predator (Kevin Peter Hall)
Predator 2 (1994 TV Asahi edition) – King Willie (Calvin Lockhart), Predator (Kevin Peter Hall)
The Replacement Killers – Michael Kogan (Jürgen Prochnow)
Resident Evil (VHS/DVD edition) – One (Colin Salmon)
Rush Hour – Luke (Clifton Powell)
Six Days Seven Nights (VHS/DVD edition) – Jager (Temuera Morrison)
Street Fighter (1997 TV Asahi edition) – Zangief (Andrew Bryniarski)
Timecop (1996 TV Asahi edition) – Cole (Richard Faraci) 
The Dark Knight (2012 TV Asahi edition) – Gambol (Michael Jai White)
Tom and Huck – Injun Joe
Transformers: Age of Extinction – Galvatron
Trespass – Savon (Ice Cube)
Underworld: Rise of the Lycans – Raze (Kevin Grevioux)

Western animation
Kevin Michael Richardson
Uncle Grandpa (Mr. Gus)
Steven Universe (Mr. Gus)
 Michael Clarke Duncan
Spider-Man: The New Animated Series (Kingpin)
Delgo (Elder Marley)
Biker Mice from Mars (Lord Camembert)
Cats Don't Dance (Max)
DuckTales (Armstrong)
Hercules (Nessus)
Home on the Range (Rico the Bounty Hunter)
Iron Man (Nick Fury)
Star Wars: The Clone Wars (Kindalo)
Teenage Mutant Ninja Turtles
TV Tokyo edition (Rat King, Chakahachi)
BS2 edition (Leatherhead)
Toonsylvania (Phil)
Treasure Planet (Scroop)
X-Men (TV Tokyo edition) (Magneto)

Tokusatsu

1992
Kyoryu Sentai Zyuranger (skeleton rickshaw driver (ep. 40 - 42))
1994
Ninja Sentai Kakuranger (Noppera-bō (ep. 39))
1996
Choukou Senshi Changerion (Darkness General Zhender/Kazuki Katayama (played by Yutaka Hirose))
B-Fighter Kabuto (Astral Saber)
1997
Denji Sentai Megaranger (Javius the First (Voice), Research staff (Actor))
1998
Seijuu Sentai Gingaman (Dotoumusha (ep. 22 - 23))
2000
Kyuukyuu Sentai GoGoFive vs Gingaman (Voice of Darkness King Gill)
Mirai Sentai Timeranger (Don Dolnero (ep. 1 - 47)/Douzan Kinjou (Actor by: Kihee Senbonmatsu) (ep. 2 - 39))
2004
Tokusou Sentai Dekaranger (Ginjifuan Kazak)
2007
Juken Sentai Gekiranger (Gorie Yen (ep. 20 - 49))
2008
Ultraman Mebius: The Armored Darkness (Armored Darkness)
Superior Ultraman 8 Brothers (Super Alien Hipporito)
2009
Kamen Rider Decade (Ayakashi Chinomanako (ep. 24)/Chinomanako Diend (ep. 24 - 25))
2010
Tomica Hero Rescue Fire (Donkaen (eps. 48 - 51 (1 - 26 Voiced by Daisuke Gōri)))
Tensou Sentai Goseiger (Yuumajuu Giemurou of the Kappa (ep. 19))
2011
Kamen Rider OOO Wonderful: The Shogun and the 21 Core Medals (Gara (Monster form))
2012
Garo: Makai Senki (Voice of Gajari (eps. 14 - 24))
Kamen Rider Wizard (Voice of Wizardragon (eps. 9, 31, 51))
2013
Kamen Rider × Kamen Rider Gaim & Wizard: The Fateful Sengoku Movie Battle (Voice of Wizardragon)

Other roles
 Dragon Ball Z Infinite World PV
 Hamlet (Marcellus)
 Sengoku Raiden Championship VTR Narration (Sengoku ~Daigojin~)

References

External links
 Ryūzaburō Ōtomo at Ryu's Seiyuu Infos
 Ryūzaburō Ōtomo at GamePlaza-Haruka Voice Acting Database 
 Ryūzaburō Ōtomo at Hitoshi Doi's Seiyuu Database 
 
 

1952 births
Living people
Japanese male video game actors
Japanese male voice actors
Male voice actors from Tokyo
Tokyo Actor's Consumer's Cooperative Society voice actors
20th-century Japanese male actors
21st-century Japanese male actors
81 Produce voice actors
Aoni Production voice actors